The Oshan X7 is a 5 and 7-seater mid-size crossover produced by Changan Automobile under the Oshan brand (known as Oushan in some markets).

History 
On 25 July 2019, it became the second car to ever be launched into space, as a dummy payload on iSpace's Hyperbola-1 rocket maiden flight.

Overview

The X7 debuted on the 2019 Shanghai Auto Show and was launched on the Chinese auto market right after with prices ranging from 79,900 yuan to 119,900 yuan. The Oshan X7 was branded under Oshan, Changan's affordable premium brand, a sub-brand that focuses on building passenger vehicles which was separated from the Oushang brand and also referred to as Oshan. Oushan/Oshan was known for producing compact MPVs and crossovers, with the COS1° being the first product of the brand.

Powertrain

Oshan X7 Plus
The X7 received a facelift for the 2021 model year called the Oshan X7 Plus. The X7 Plus was launched during the 2021 Shanghai Autoshow featuring redesigned fronts end and rear ends with split head lamps and full-width tail lamps.

References

External links
Official website 

Oshan X7
Crossover sport utility vehicles
Cars of China
Cars introduced in 2019

Cars launched into space